Year 662 (DCLXII) was a common year starting on Saturday (link will display the full calendar) of the Julian calendar. The denomination 662 for this year has been used since the early medieval period, when the Anno Domini calendar era became the prevalent method in Europe for naming years.

Events 
 By place 

 Europe 
 King Godepert makes war against his brother Perctarit. He seeks the aid of Grimoald I, duke of Benevento, who has him assassinated; his son Raginpert escapes. Grimoald usurps the throne and becomes ruler of the Lombard Kingdom. Perctarit is exiled, and seeks refuge in Gaul and Britain.
 The Franks take advantage of the Lombard civil war and invade Northern Italy, but are defeated by Grimoald I. King Chlothar III gives Austrasia to his youngest brother Childeric II. He is raised on the shield of his warriors and proclaimed king of Austrasia.

 Britain 
 King Swithelm of Essex is converted to Christianity and baptised by Cedd, at the court of King Æthelwald of East Anglia, who acts as his sponsor. East Anglia may have held some sort of overlordship over Essex at this time (approximate date).

 Arab Empire 
 Muslim Conquest: Arab forces of the Umayyad Caliphate resume the push to capture Persian lands, and begin to move towards the lands east and north of the plateau, towards Greater Khorasan (Iran) and the Silk Road along Transoxiana.
 Ziyad ibn Abi Sufyan, Muslim general and a member of the Umayyad clan, is appointed governor of Iraq (Basra) and the former Persian provinces (approximate date).

 By topic 

 Religion 
 August 13 – Maximus the Confessor, Byzantine monk and theologian, dies in exile in Lazica (modern Georgia), on the southeastern shore of the Black Sea.

Births 
 June 22 – Rui Zong, emperor of the Tang Dynasty (d. 716)
 Ali al-Akbar ibn Husayn, Muslim martyr (b. 680)
 Kakinomoto no Hitomaro, Japanese poet (approximate date)
 Kusakabe, Japanese crown prince (d. 689)
 Odile of Alsace, Frankish abbess (approximate date)
 Rumwold of Buckingham, Anglo-Saxon prince and saint

Deaths 
 August 13 – Maximus the Confessor, Byzantine theologian
 Godepert, king of the Lombards
 Rumwold of Buckingham, Anglo-Saxon prince and saint
 Lai Ji, official of the Tang Dynasty (b. 610)
 Qais Abdur Rashid from whom all Pashtuns descend according to local Pashto folklore

References